Planica 1948 was an International ski flying week competition held from 14—17 March 1948 in Planica, PR Slovenia, FPR Yugoslavia. Over 20,000 people has gathered in total. The best jump counted as final result.

Schedule

Competition
On 11 March 1948, the first day of training jumps at the international ski flying week was on schedule. But it was canceled due to high temperatures and sun which was melting the snow.

On 12 March 1948, the second day the international ski flying week on schedule also did not allow any jumps. Again due to weather conditions, temperatures got little cooler but snow under was still not hard enough.

On 13 March 1948, the first and only training was held at last after weather problems two days in a row. A couple of thousands people has gathered, who have seen morning and afternoon event with two rounds. Fritz Tschannen was the longest at 104 metres.

On 14 March 1948, opening with the first day of competition was on schedule, in the morning event with two rounds and afternoon event only with one jump due to icy inrun track. Janez Polda touched the ground at 120 metres world record distance in the morning event and another world record distance was beat at the afternoon event when Swiss jumper Charles Blum crashed at 121 metres. Total of 10,000 people has gathered that day.

On 15 March 1948, the second day of competition was on schedule with the morning and afternoon event, both times with three rounds. Fritz Tschannen set the world record at 120 metres in his last attempt of day at afternoon event.

On 16 March 1948, the third day of competition was on schedule in the morning event with three rounds, afternoon was canceled due to high temperatures and melting snow. Rudi Finžgar was the longest with 104 metres in front of 3,000 people.

On 17 March 1948, the last day of international ski flying week competition was on schedule, but with two rounds only as due to weather conditions event was ended right after. Fritz Tschannen won the four-day competition with 120 m in the battle for the best jump.

Training
13 March 1948 — 9:30 AM — Four rounds — chronological order

Competition: Day 1
14 March 1948 — 10:00 AM — Three rounds — chronological order

Competition: Day 2
15 March 1948 — 10:00 AM — Five rounds — chronological order

Competition: Day 3
16 March 1948 — 9:50 AM — Three rounds — chronological order

Competition: Day 4
17 March 1948 — Two rounds — ranking incomplete — points N/A

 Not recognized. Crash at WR! Yugoslavian national record! World record! Fall or touch!

Official results

International Ski Flying Week
14–17 March 1948 – the best jump

Ski flying world records

 Not recognized! Touch at world record distance. Not recognized! Crash at world record distance.

References

1948 in Yugoslav sport
1948 in ski jumping
1948 in Slovenia
Ski jumping competitions in Yugoslavia
International sports competitions hosted by Yugoslavia
Ski jumping competitions in Slovenia
International sports competitions hosted by Slovenia